Ge or GE may refer to:

Businesses
 General Electric, a multinational American technology and services conglomerate
 GE Appliances, an American home appliance manufacturer
 30 Rockefeller Center, a 1933 Art Deco skyscraper in Midtown Manhattan formerly known as the GE Building
 TransAsia Airways (IATA: GE), an airline based in Taipei, Taiwan

Language
 Ge (Cyrillic) (Г, г), a letter of the Cyrillic alphabet
 Ghe with upturn (Ґ, ґ), a letter of the Ukrainian alphabet
 ġē, a plural Old English pronoun
 Gê languages, spoken by the Gê, a group of indigenous people in Brazil
 Gejia language, spoken in China

People
 Aleksandr Ge (1879–1919), Russian anarchist
 Nikolai Ge (1831–1894), Russian painter
 Ge Xiaoguang (born 1953), Chinese artist
 Ge You (born 1957), Chinese film actor

Places
 Canton of Geneva, a western canton of Switzerland
 Equatorial Guinea, abbreviation in French and Spanish
 Georgia (country), ISO country code
 .ge, the Internet country code top-level domain (ccTLD) for Georgia
 Germany, obsolete NATO country code
 Gilbert and Ellice Islands, former ISO country code
 Province of Genoa, ISO 3166-2:IT code, a province of Italy
 German Empire 1871–1918

Science and technology

Biology and medicine
 Ge (butterfly), a genus of butterflies in the grass skipper family
 Ganglionic eminence, a transitory structure in the developing brain
 Gastroenteritis, a condition that causes irritation and inflammation of the gastrointestinal tract
 Genetic engineering, the direct manipulation of an organism's genes

Computing
 Gate equivalent, a manufacturing-technology-independent complexity measure in integrated circuit design (electronics)
 Gigabit Ethernet, a networking technology
 Google Earth, computer software to view satellite images of Earth
 "Greater than or equal to", an inequality operator used in some programming languages
 Grid Engine, a batch-queuing system for computer clusters

Other uses in science and technology
 Germanium, symbol Ge, a chemical element
 Giant elliptical galaxy, a specific type of elliptical galaxy
 GE an old scale for measuring film speed

Other uses
 Gaia or Gê, a Greek goddess personifying the Earth
 Gē, an ancient Chinese dagger-axe
 GE – Good Ending, a manga by Kei Sasuga
 Gê peoples, indigenous peoples in Brazil
 A short-form for General election, an event where people vote for members in a political body
 Global Entry, trusted traveler program of the United States
 Granado Espada, a massively multiplayer online game from Korea